Crazy Vuk's border (Serbian: Међа Вука манитога/Međa Vuka manitoga), sometimes also called Dukljan's border (Дукљанова међа/Dukljanova međa) is remains of a border wall in Montenegro. It follows the line Dubrovnik-Bijela gora (above Grahovo)-Cuce-Čevska planina-Ostrog-Razbijeni vrh (Bjelopavlići)-Donja Morača-Kom.

Serbian poet Matija Bećković wrote a book of poems of the same name.

External links
 Međa Vuka Manitoga

References

Borders of Montenegro